The gag bit is a type of bit for a horse.  Because the cheek piece and reins attach to different rings (instead of freely moving on the same ring, like in a snaffle bit) there is leverage action.  Severity of leverage action depends on where the reins attach. For example, in a Dutch Gag, the further the rein attachment from the mouthpiece the greater the leverage. The gag bit is related to a Pelham bit and a double bridle but the gag bit has no curb strap.

Some styles of gag bit are integral to a special bridle, known as a gag bridle;  others are used with a standard bridle.  Inside the horse's mouth, the gag bit may be jointed like a snaffle bit or smooth like a Mullen mouth bit.

Usage 

The gag bit works on the horse's lips and poll simultaneously. The pressure on the lips tends to make the horse raise its head, which is useful for a horse that tends to lean on the bit.  Gag bits are used mainly for horses that are strong pullers or for horses that need retraining. Gag bits are most commonly seen in polo, eventing (especially for cross-country), show jumping, and hacking, mainly for increased control at times where a horse may be excited or try to run off with the rider.

They can also be used to help elevate a horse that is heavy on its front end.

They are not permitted at any level of dressage(only snaffles are permitted in dressage), since dressage riders are trying to get the horse to come down onto the bit, and want to encourage the horse to accept contact. Additionally, the horse is supposed to be completely submissive in dressage, and a gag bit gives the impression that it is not. Gags are also never seen in the hunter arena, again because riders wish to portray that the horse is an easy ride, and because the ideal is a long, relaxed frame with the neck stretched out, rather than a high neck.

Gag bits are also occasionally seen in western-style competition, usually in the form of a sliding mouthpiece on a shanked curb-style bit (similar to the American gag).

The gag bit normally is used with two sets of reins; one on the bit ring that does not apply gag leverage, and the other on the small ring attached to the cord or rolled leather strap of the gag bridle cheekpiece. This allows for the bit to be used as a normal snaffle, with gag action used only when needed. Polo players, who must ride with the reins in one hand and cannot make instant fine adjustments, often use a gag bit with draw reins.

Types 

 Gag snaffle
 Similar in shape to a snaffle, with a mouthpiece and a ring on either side. Each bit ring has two holes: one on the top and one on the bottom. Gag cheekpieces, made of rounded leather or of rope, are run through these holes. The end on these cheekpieces, after passing through both holes, have a metal ring to which the reins are attached. When rein pressure is applied, the bit slides upward and rotates slightly in the mouth. Severity is determined by the ring size: the larger the rings, the more severe the gag. The gag snaffle includes the Balding gag, which has a loose-ring design, and Cheltenham gags which have an eggbutt design.  A "gag snaffle" is not a snaffle bit, although it can be adjusted to act like one if the rider only attaches a rein to the bit rings and not to the sliding gag cheekpieces.

 Dutch gag
 Also known as the Continental, Three/Four-ring or Pessoa gag. Similar to the elevator, except the cheekpieces consist of stacked rings. There is usually only one ring above the mouthpiece, to which the cheekpiece is attached. The ring below that is attached straight to the mouthpiece, and acts similarly to a snaffle. The lower ring(s), of which there are usually two, are for a second rein to be attached, and they provide the gag action. The lower the second rein is placed on the stack, the more "leverage" (raising of the mouthpiece up along the cheekpiece) is applied. Dutch gags are useful because they provide options for the severity of the bit.  The bridle cheek pieces are attached to the top rings to produce pressure.the lower the reins are fitted, the stronger the leverage action on the horses mouth.

 American gag or elevator
 Has the shape of an "H". It has one ring on the upper shank, to attach the cheekpiece of the bridle. There is a lower shank, for the gag rein, and a middle loop to which it is possible to attach a snaffle rein. The mouthpiece has the ability to slide up the curved sides of the bit as the reins are taken up, putting pressure on the corners of the mouth and encouraging the horse to raise his head. Unlike the Dutch gag, the American gag does not offer options for the height the reins may be attached. The American Gag bit applies pressure to the poll of a horse's head, to gain greater control of the horse. Using this bit for greater control should only be used as a last resort.

 Half-ring or Duncan gag 
 A particularly severe type of gag. Similar to the snaffle gag, except it has a half ring. The ring ends have holes, through which the cheekpieces run. Unlike the snaffle gag, however, there is no connection between these two holes to the outside of the bit, so only the gag rein can be used (if two were used, the snaffle rein would have to attach to the rounded cheekpieces).

References 

Bits (horse)